The  was a siege in 1561 against the castle of Moji in Japan. The castle belonged to the Mōri clan, whose capital was the city of Yamaguchi.

Background
The original castle was built by Ōuchi Yoshinaga (Sorin younger brother), who was forced to kill himself in 1557 with the advance of Mōri forces. Mōri Motonari captured the fort in 1558. Otomo Sorin recaptured the castle in September 1559. The Mōri, led by Kobayakawa Takakage and Ura Munekatsu, quickly recaptured the castle.

The battle
In 1561, forces under Ōtomo Sōrin attacked the castle in alliance with the Portuguese, who provided three ships between 500 and 600 tons, each with a crew of about 300 and 17 or 18 cannons. This is thought to be the first bombardment by foreign ships on Japan.

The bombardment permitted the Ōtomo troops to establish themselves around Moji castle. After expending their ammunition, however, the Portuguese withdrew.

The castle's defenders nevertheless managed to break the siege lines and reinforce the castle. Ōtomo led an all-out assault on the castle on 10 Oct. 1561, but the assault failed, and the castle finally remained in Mōri possession.

See also
 Battle of Fukuda Bay (1565) – A Japanese flotilla attacks a Portuguese carrack and fails to capture it in the first naval clash between Japan and the West.
 Battle of Manila (1574) - A Chinese and Japanese pirate fleet attacked Manila with the goal to capture the city.
 Battle of Cagayan (1582) – A fleet of Asian pirates led by Japanese attack and are defeated by a Spanish flotilla.
 Nossa Senhora da Graça incident (1610) – A Japanese flotilla attacks a Portuguese carrack that ends in the latter's sinking.
 Second attack on Kamishi (9 August 1945) – last direct naval bombardment of the Japanese home islands in World War II.

Notes

1561 in Japan
Conflicts in 1561
Mōri clan
Moji 1561
Moji 1561
Moji 1561